Davide Milesi (born 27 December 1964) is a retired long-distance runner from Italy.

Biography
He represented his native country at the 1996 Summer Olympics in Atlanta, Georgia. There he finished in 50th place in the men's marathon. He won the gold medal in the men's marathon race at the 1993 Mediterranean Games on 1993-06-20 in Narbonne, France, finishing in 2:18:42.

Achievements

External links
 
 Davide Milesi at RAI

1964 births
Living people
Italian male long-distance runners
Italian male marathon runners
Italian male mountain runners
Athletes (track and field) at the 1996 Summer Olympics
Olympic athletes of Italy
Sportspeople from Bergamo
Mediterranean Games gold medalists for Italy
Mediterranean Games medalists in athletics
Athletes (track and field) at the 1993 Mediterranean Games
20th-century Italian people